Olmsted is a surname. People with the name include:

 The notable Olmsted family of New York City:
 Frederick Law Olmsted, American landscape architect
 his sons John Charles Olmsted and Frederick Law Olmsted, Jr., also landscape architects, and their company Olmsted Brothers
John Charles Olmsted (1852–1920), landscape architect, adopted son of Frederick Law Olmsted
George W. Olmsted (b. 1874), founder of Long Island Lighting Company (LILCo), patron of the Chief Cornplanter Council, Boy Scouts of America
 George H. Olmsted (b. 1901), veteran of World War I and World War II, General in the United States Army, life insurance magnate, and philanthropist
 Aaron Olmsted, investor in the Connecticut Land Company in the United States
 Andrew J. Olmsted, a U.S. soldier during the Iraq occupation
 Charles M. Olmsted (1881-1948), an American aeronautical engineer
 Dan Olmsted, a senior editor for United Press International (UPI) and author of the Age of Autism reports
 David Olmsted (1822–1861), an American politician
 Denison Olmsted, an American astronomer
 Elizabeth Martha Olmsted (1825–1910), American poet
 Frederick E. Olmsted (1872–1925), American Forester
 Frederick E. Olmsted Jr. (1911–1990), WPA artist, muralist, and scientist (Son of Frederick E. Olmsted)
 John Olmsted (naturalist) (1938–2011), an American naturalist and conservationist
 John W. Olmsted (1903–1986), an American historian
 Nathan Olmsted (1812-1898), an American politician
 Richard Olmsted (settler) (died 1686/7), early New England (Connecticut) settler
 Thomas Olmsted, an American prelate of the Catholic Church
 Katharine (Kit) Olmsted (2001-), an American amateur athlete, NCAA Division I Champion

References